Johann Jacob Vitriarius (8 June 1679 - 12 December 1745) was a Dutch jurist of German descent.

Life
Johann Jacob Vitrarius was the son of the German jurist Philipp Reinhard Vitriarius, who between 1675 and 1682 taught law at the Geneva Academy. At the age of 2 or 3 he moved to Leiden in the Dutch Republic when his father became professor at Leiden University. Eventually, Vitriarius studied law at the same university, earning a doctorate there in 1701 with the thesis  Disputio juridica inauguralis de acquisitione rerum originaria.

Vitrarius became a professor of law at Heidelberg University in 1706  and was appointed to the law faculty at Utrecht University on 4 June 1708, commencing on 17 September 1708. During 1714-15 he was Rector Magnificus at Utrecht. He left Utrecht in 1719 to take up a position at Leiden. Here he took the place of his father, and was equally widely acclaimed, particularly by the German students who at that time often studied at Dutch universities. He taught at Leiden until 15 January 1720.

Vitrarius died on 12 December 1745 in Leiden, aged 66.

Bibliography

 Annotati ad Grotii de jure belli ac pacis libros tres, 1724 
 Annotata ad Sam. Stryckii examen juris feudalis. XVIII century, 1724 
 Notes on Roman Law, Alexander Boswell, 1724 , 1724 
 Observationes in Hugonem Grotium de Jure Belli ac Pacis. 1728-29, Alexander Boswell, 1724 
 Institutiones Juris Naturae et Gentium ad Methodum Hugonis Grotii., Samuelem Luchtmans Leiden 1734, with Philippus Reinhardus Vitriarius, Johann Franz Buddeus
 Oratio funebris in obitum Aatonii Shcultingii, Halae Magdeburgicae, 1734

References
Citations

Sources

1679 births
1745 deaths

Dutch jurists
Leiden University alumni
Academic staff of Utrecht University
Academic staff of Leiden University
Rectors of universities in the Netherlands

People from Leiden